Larisa Neiland and Todd Woodbridge were the defending champions, but competed this year with different partners. Neiland teamed up with Mark Woodforde and were eliminated in semifinals, while Woodbridge partnered with Nicole Bradtke and were eliminated in quarterfinals.

Patricia Tarabini and Javier Frana won the title, defeating Nicole Arendt and Luke Jensen 6–2, 6–2 in the final. It was the 1st and only mixed doubles title for both players in their careers.

Seeds
The seeded players are listed below. Patricia Tarabini and Javier Frana are the champions; others show the round in which they were eliminated.All seeds received a bye into the second round.

Draw

Finals

Top half

Section 1

Section 2

Bottom half

Section 3

Section 4

External links
 Official results archive (WTA)
1996 French Open – Doubles draws and results at the International Tennis Federation

Mixed Doubles
1996